For other battles in the same area but in different years, see Battle of Homs.

The first Battle of Homs was fought in Homs, Syria, on December 10, 1260, between the Ilkhanates of Persia and the forces of Egypt.

After the historic Mamluk victory over the Ilkhanates at the Battle of Ain Jalut in September 1260, Hulagu Khan of the Ilkhanate had the Ayyubid Sultan of Damascus and other Ayyubid princes executed in revenge, thus effectively ending the dynasty in Syria. However, the defeat at Ain Jalut forced the Ilkhanate armies out of Syria and the Levant.

The main cities of Syria, Aleppo and Damascus were thus left open to Mamluk occupation.  But Homs and Hama remained in the possession of minor Ayyubid princes. These princes, rather than the Mamluks of Cairo themselves, actually fought and won the First Battle of Homs.

Due to the open war between Hulagu and his cousin Berke of the Golden Horde during the civil war of the Mongol Empire, the Ilkhanate could only afford to send 6,000 troops back into Syria to retake control of the lands. This expedition was initiated by Ilkhanate generals such as Baidu who was forced to leave Gaza when the Mamluks advanced just before the battle of Ain Jalut. After attacking Aleppo, the force travelled southwards to Homs, but were decisively defeated. This ended the first campaign into Syria by the Ilkhanate, though there were several later incursions,  none of which ended with conquests lasting more than a year.

See also 

Second Battle of Homs (1281)
 Battle of Wadi al-Khazandar (1299/1300)

Notes

Bibliography
 Amitai-Preiss, Reuven (1995) Mongols and Mamluks: The Mamluk-Ilkhanid War, 1260–1281. Cambridge University Press, Cambridge. 
 Nicolle, Warlords., p. 117
 J. J. Saunders, The Mongol Defeat at 'Ain Jalut, in. Muslims and Mongols, (ed. by G.W.Rice), p. 69.
 Waterson, James (2007) The Knights of Islam: The Wars of the Mamluks. Greenhill Books, London. 

Homs 1
Homs 1
Homs
Homs
1260 in Asia
Aga
Aga